Take Time With Noel Harrison is a Canadian music variety television series which aired on CBC Television from 1974 to 1976.

Premise
This series was produced at the CBHT Studios in Halifax, Nova Scotia, featuring British musician Noel Harrison who was living in Nova Scotia since 1972. Episodes were supported by a six-member music group led by John Redmond.

Visiting artists included John Allan Cameron, Shirley Eikhard, Bob Carpenter, Fraser & DeBolt, Tom Gallant, Beverly Glenn-Copeland, Dee Higgins, Tommy Makem, Colleen Peterson, Jack Schechtman, Stringband and Brent Titcomb.

Scheduling
This half-hour series was broadcast on Saturdays in its first season at 6:30 p.m. (Eastern time) from 19 October 1974 to 13 September 1975. The second season was broadcast Thursdays at 7:30 p.m. from 18 September 1975 to 15 January 1976.

References

External links
 
 

CBC Television original programming
Television shows filmed in Halifax, Nova Scotia
1974 Canadian television series debuts
1976 Canadian television series endings
1970s Canadian music television series
1970s Canadian variety television series